William Thomas Fry (1789–1843) was a British engraver. He occasionally exhibited his engravings at the Suffolk Street exhibition.

Works

Fry worked chiefly in stipple. He engraved four portraits for Fisher, Son, & Co.'s National Portrait Gallery:

Princess Charlotte, and the Earl of Liverpool, after Sir T. Lawrence; 
Admiral Earl Howe, after Gainsborough Dupont; and 
 the Rev. Samuel Lee, after Richard Evans.

He also engraved portraits, after J. Jackson, R.A., including Robert Hills, the animal painter, John Scott the engraver, and others. For Jones's National Gallery he executed eleven engravings.

External Links
 , an engraving of a painting by Edward Francis Burney with poetical illustration by Letitia Elizabeth Landon published in the Forget Me Not annual for 1824.
 , an engraving of a painting by Pierre-Nolasque Bergeret, with poetical accompaniment by Letitia Elizabeth Landon for Friendship's Offering annual for 1826.
 , engraving of an image drawn by Henry Corbould of Chantrey's sculpture and accompanied by Felicia Hemans's poem, The Child's Last Sleep, for the Friendship's Offering annual for 1826.
 , engraving of Thomas Lawrence's portrait for Fisher's Drawing Room Scrap Book, 1833 with a poetical illustration by Letitia Elizabeth Landon.

References

1789 births
1843 deaths
British engravers
19th-century engravers